Cerny is a commune in the Essonne department in Île-de-France in northern France. It is 53 km South of Paris.

It has an airfield named Aérodrome de Cerny - La Ferté-Alais, including an airplane museum.

Inhabitants of Cerny are known as Cernois.

Architectural heritage
Saint-Pierre Church, from the 13th century, officially became a historical monument 10 February 1948.
Château de Villiers: François I gave the Villiers castle to Jean de Selve, after de Selve negotiated the Madrid treaty in 1526.

Notable people from this commune
Cécile Carnot (1841-1898), widow of Sadi Carnot, 4th president of the Third Republic. She died in Château de Presles.
Philippe Clay (1927-2007), singer and actor who lived there

See also
 La Ferté-Alais Air Show
 Communes of the Essonne department

References

External links

Official website 

Mayors of Essonne Association 

Communes of Essonne